In Germany, the Presidential Order on Rank Designation and Uniform of Soldiers (Anordnung des Bundespräsidenten über die Dienstgradbezeichnungen und die Uniform der Soldaten) is a presidential decree on the ranks and uniforms of the German Federal Defence Forces (Bundeswehr).

German military uniforms